Dattatreya, Dattā or Dattaguru, is a paradigmatic Sannyasi (monk) and one of the lords of yoga, venerated as a Hindu god. In Maharashtra, Goa, Andhra Pradesh, Telangana, Karnataka, Gujarat, and Madhya Pradesh he is a syncretic deity, In Bengal he is known as 'Trinath', avatar of the three Hindu gods Brahma, Vishnu, and Shiva, who are also collectively known as the Trimurti. In other regions, and some versions of texts such as Garuda Purana, Brahma Purana and Sattvata Samhita, he is an avatar of Vishnu only. Several Upanishads are dedicated to him, as are texts of the Vedanta-Yoga tradition in Hinduism. One of the most important texts of Hinduism, namely Avadhuta Gita (literally, "song of the free soul") is attributed to Dattatreya. Over time, Dattatreya has inspired many monastic movements in Shaivism, Vaishnavism, and Shaktism, particularly in the Deccan region of India, south India, Gujarat, Madhya Pradesh, Rajasthan and Himalayan regions where Shiva tradition has been strong. His pursuit of simple life, kindness to all, sharing of his knowledge and the meaning of life during his travels is reverentially mentioned in the poems by Tukaram, a saint-poet of the Bhakti movement.

According to Rigopoulos, in the Nath tradition of Shaivism, Dattatreya is revered as the Adi-Guru (First Teacher) of the Adinath Sampradaya of the Nathas, the first "Lord of Yoga" with mastery of Tantra (techniques), although most traditions and scholars consider Adi Nath to be an epithet of Lord Shiva. According to Mallinson, Dattatreya is not the traditional guru of the Nath Sampradaya but instead was co-opted by the Nath tradition in about the 18th century as a guru, as a part of Vishnu-Shiva syncretism. This is evidenced by the Marathi text Navanathabhaktisara, states Mallinson, wherein there is syncretic fusion of the Nath Sampradaya with the Mahanubhava sect by identifying nine Naths with nine Narayanas.

Dattatreya iconography varies regionally. In Maharashtra, for example, he is typically shown with three heads and six hands, one head each for Brahma, Vishnu and Shiva who represent the Trimurti, the 3 main gods in Hinduism, and one pair of hands holding the symbolic items associated with each of these gods: japamala and water pot of Brahma, conch and discus of Vishnu, trident and drum of Shiva. He is typically dressed as a simple monk, situated in a forest or wilderness suggestive of his renunciation of worldly goods and pursuit of a meditative yogic lifestyle. In paintings and some large carvings, he is surrounded by four dogs and a cow, which symbolise the four Vedas and mother earth who nourishes all living beings. In the temples of southern Maharashtra, Varanasi, and in the Himalayas, he is shown with one head and two hands accompanied by four dogs and a cow.

An annual festival in the Hindu calendar month of Mārgaśīrṣa (November/December) reveres Dattatreya and is known as Datta Jayanti.

Life 
In the Puranas, he was born in an Indian hermitage to Anasuya and her husband, the Vedic sage, Atri who is traditionally credited with making the largest contribution to the Rigveda. It is said that they lived in Mahur, Nanded District, Maharashtra. Another states that his father lived in the western Deccan region. A third claims he was born in the jungles of Kashmir near the sacred Amarnath Temple. A fourth legend states he was born along with his brothers Durvasa and Chandra, to an unwed mother named Anusuya, In a fifth myth, sage Atri was very old when young Anusuya married him and they sought the help of the trimurti gods for a child. As the trinity were pleased with them for having brought light and knowledge to the world, instantly granted the boon, which led Dattatreya to be born with characteristics of all three.

While his origins are unclear, stories about his life are clearer. He is described in the Mahabharata as an exceptional Rishi (sage) with extraordinary insights and knowledge, who is adored and raised to a Guru and an Avatar of Vishnu in the Puranas. Dattatreya is stated in these texts to having renounced the world and leaving his home at an early age to lead a monastic life. One myth claims he meditated immersed in water for a long time, another has him wandering from childhood and the young Dattatreya footprints have been preserved on a lonely peak at Girnar (Junagadh, Gujarat). and Dattatray make a tapa for 12000 years over there. The Tripura-rahasya refers to the disciple Parasurama finding Dattatreya meditating on Gandhamadana mountain, Near Rameswaram, Tamil Nadu.

Dattatreya is said to have his lunch daily by taking alms at a holy place Pithapuram, Andhra Pradesh, where he was born as Sripada Sri Vallabha (his first avatar).

Self-education: The 24 Gurus of Dattatreya 
The young Dattatreya is famous in the Hindu texts as the one who started with nothing and without teachers, yet reached self-awareness by observing nature during his Sannyasi wanderings, and treating these natural observations as his twenty four teachers. This legend has been emblematic in the Hindu belief, particularly among artists and Yogis, that ideas, teachings and practices come from all sources, that self effort is a means to learning. The 24 teachers of Dattatreya are:

Iconography 
 
The appearance of Shri Dattatreya in pictures varies according to traditional beliefs. A typical icon for Dattatreya, particularly popular with Marathi-speaking people in India, has three heads corresponding to Brahma-Vishnu-Shiva, and six hands; the lowest two hands carry japamala and water pot (kamandalu), middle pair of hands hold hourglass mini-drum (damaru) and trident (trishul), and top two hands have conch (shankh) and spinning wheel (chakra).

Many older medieval temples of Dattatreya show him with just one head, such as the one in Mahur, one at Narayanpur on Pune Satara Road, Near Pune, and another in Pandharpur, both in southern Maharashtra. Texts such as Agni Purana describe the architectural features for building murti, and for Dattatreya, it recommends him with one head and two hands. In Varanasi, Nepal, north Himalayan foothill states of India, 15th-century Nath temples of Dattatreya show him with just one face. In western parts of Maharashtra, the syncretic six armed and three faced iconography is more common.

He is the motif of the '"honey bee" Yogin who has realized advaita knowledge. Dattatreya as the archetypal model of syncretism:

Another distinctive aspect of Dattatreya iconography is that it includes four dogs and a cow. The four dogs represent the Vedas, as trustworthy all weather friends, company and guardians, while the cow is a metaphor for mother earth who silently and always provides nourishment.

Alternate iconography 
Dattatreya's sculptures with alternate iconography have been identified in 1st millennium CE cave temples and archaeological sites related to Hinduism. For example, in the Badami temple (Karnataka), Dattatreya is shown to be with single head and four hands like Vishnu, but seated in a serene Yoga posture (padmasana). Carved with him are the emblems (lañchana) of the Trimurti, namely the swan of Brahma, the Garuda of Vishnu and the Nandi of Shiva. The right earlobe jewelry and hair decoration in this art work of Dattatreya is of Shiva, but on his left the details are those of Vishnu. Rigopoulos dates this Badami sculpture to be from the 10th to 12th century.

A sculpture similar to Badami, but with some differences, has been discovered in Ajmer (Rajasthan). The Ajmer art work is a free statue where Dattatreya is standing, has one head and four hands. In his various hands, he carries a Trishula of Shiva, a Chakra of Vishnu, a Kamandalu of Brahma, and a rosary common to all three. Like the Badami relief work, the Ajmer iconography of Dattatreya shows the swan of Brahma, the Garuda of Vishnu and the Nandi of Shiva carved on the pedestal with him.

Some scholars such as James Harle and TA Gopinatha Rao consider iconography that presents Brahma-Vishnu-Shiva together as Hari Hara Pitamaha to be synonymous with or equivalent to Dattatreya. Antonio Rigopoulos questions this identification, and suggests that Harihara Pitamaha iconography may have been a prelude to and something that evolved into Dattatreya iconography.

Symbolism 

The historic Indian literature has interpreted the representation of Dattatreya symbolically. His three heads are symbols of the Gunas (qualities in Samkhya school of Hinduism). The three Gunas are Sattva, Rajas and Tamas. The six hands have ethical symbolism, namely Yamas, Niyama, Sama, Dama, Daya and Shanti (axiology in Yoga and Vedanta school of Hinduism).

The Kamadhenu cow is symbolic Panchabutas, the four dogs are inner forces of a human being: Iccha, Vasana, Asha and Trishna. In these interpretations, Dattatreya is that yogi Guru (teacher) who has perfected all these, rules them rather than is ruled by them, and is thus the Guru Dattatreya is beyond them.

Texts 

The Dattatreya Upanishad (tantra-focussed), Darshana Upanishad (yoga-focussed) and particularly the Avadhuta Upanishad (advaita-focussed) present the philosophy of the Dattatreya tradition. Dattatreya is also mentioned in the classic text on Yoga, the Shandilya Upanishad.

Other Upanishads where Dattatreya's name appears in lists of ancient Hindu monks revered for their insights on renunciation are Jabala Upanishad, Naradaparivrajaka Upanishad, Bhikshuka Upanishad and Yajnavalkya Upanishad. Of these, his mention in the Jabala Upanishad is chronologically significant because this ancient text is dated to have been complete between the 3rd century BCE and 3rd century CE.

Tripura Rahasya is also an important ancient text attributed to Dattatreya.

Dattatreya is mentioned in the Mahabharata and the Ramayana.

Dattatreya is mentioned in the ancient chapter 9 of the Sattvata Samhita and chapter 5 of the Ahirbudhnya Samhita, both among the oldest layer of texts in the Vaishnava Agama tradition (Pancaratra). Schrader states these texts and the chronology of Dattatreya are older than the Mahabharata, but Rigopoulos disagrees with him on the chronology.

In the Hindu tradition, Dattatreya is the author of Avadhuta Gita, or the "Song of the free". The text's poetry is based on the principles of Advaita Vedanta, one of the subschools of Hindu philosophy.

The extant manuscripts have been dated to approximately the 9th or 10th century, but it may have existed earlier as part of an oral tradition. It consists of 289 shlokas (metered verses), divided into eight chapters.

P.P. Vasudevanand Saraswati Tembe Swami Maharaj has written an extensive literature on Lord Dattatreya and his incarnations including Sripada Srivallabha of Pithapur, Andhra Pradesh and Shri Nrusimhsaraswati Swami Maharaj of Ganagapur, Karnataka. The literature mainly includes Stotras-Hymns  that praise lord Dattatreya and various deities, books on Lord Dattatreya.

Dattatreya traditions 

Several Hindu monastic and yoga traditions are linked to Dattatreya:

 Nath sampradaya: The Nath yogis, that metamorphosed into a warrior ascetic group, consider Dattatreya as their theological founder. This group grew and became particularly prominent during the Islamic invasions and Hindu-Muslim wars in South Asia, from about the 14th to 18th century, although the Dattatreya roots of the peaceful Nath yogis go back to about the 10th century. The group was most active in Rajasthan, Gujarat, Maharashtra, Madhya Pradesh, Uttar Pradesh and Nepal. The tradition believes that the legendary Nath sampradaya yogi and Hatha Yoga innovator Gorakshanath was inspired and shaped by Dattatreya. Regional efforts and texts of the Nath tradition such as Yogi sampradaya vishkriti discussed Dattatreya.
 Avadhuta sampradaya: The nine Narayanas of the Avadhuta sampradaya are attributed to Dattatreya, an idea also found in the Natha sampradaya. A panth started by Pantmaharaj Balekundrikar of Balekundri near Belgavi is related to this. Also a saint named Shri Prabhakar Keshavrao motiwale follows the same path from years, and also Datt sampradaya is followed in his ashram located at kanadia, indore (Madhya Pradesh)
Dasanami sampradaya and Shakti pithas: Dattatreya is revered in Dasanami and goddess-oriented Shaktism traditions.
 Bhakti traditions: Dattatetreya's theology emphasizing simple life, kindness to all, questioning the status quo, self pursuit of knowledge and seeking spiritual meaning of life appealed to Bhakti sant-poets of Hinduism such as Tukaram and Eknath, during an era of political and social upheavel caused by Islamic invasion in the Deccan region of India. They reverentially mentioned Dattatreya in their poems. The use of his symbolism was one of the many syncretic themes of this period where the ideas of Vaishnavism and Shaivism holistically fused in popular imagination.
 Mahanubhava tradition: Along with Krishna, the Mahanubhava tradition considers Dattatreya as their divine inspiration. The Mahanubhava Panth, propagated by Sri Chakradhar Swami, has five Krishnas, of which Dattatreya is one as their Adi Guru (the original Guru), as well as the early teachers in their tradition (Chakradhar, Gundam, Changdev). They worship Dattatreya as single headed with two arms. He has a temple dedicated in Mahur by this tradition.
Gurucharitra tradition: This tradition is named after the Marathi text Gurucharitra consisting of 51 chapters, containing the life stories of 14th-century Datta Avatar Sripada Srivallabha and 15th-century Datta Avatar Narasimha Saraswati. The text was composed by Sarasvati Gangadhara, consists of three sections called Jnanakanda (chapters 1–24), Karmakanda (25–37) and Bhaktikanda (38–51), and is considered a sacred mantra-filled text in the Gurucharita tradition in parts of Maharashtra, north Karnataka and Gujarat. Ganagapur in kalaburagi north Karnataka is an important pilgrimage center in this tradition.
Manik Prabhu (Sakalamata) Sampradaya: In this tradition, Dattatreya is worshipped with his Shakti, known as Madhumati. This tradition was started by the 19th century saint Shri Manik Prabhu, who is considered an Avatar of Dattatreya. Manik Nagar is the spiritual headquarters of this Sampradaya. Shri Manik Prabhu also established a Guru Parampara at Maniknagar for the spiritual guidance of devotees. Shri Manik Prabhu and his successors have written many abhangas and bhajans in Marathi & Kannada in praise of lord Dattatreya which are regularly sung at Manik Nagar.
 Lal Padris: another Hindu yogi group from western India with roots in the 10th-century and with ideas similar to Nath and Kanphata sampradaya, traces Dattatreya as the basis of their spiritual ideas.
 Around 1550 CE, Dattatreya Yogi taught the Dattatreya philosophy to his disciple Das Gosavi in Marathi. Das Gosavi then taught this philosophy to his two Telugu disciples Gopalbhatt and Sarvaved who studied and translated Das Gosavi's book of Vedantavyavaharsangraha into Telugu language. According to Prof. R. C. Dhere, Dattatreya Yogi and Das Gosavi are the original gurus in the Telugu Dattatreya tradition. Prof. Venkata Rao states that Dattatreya Shatakamu was written by Paramanandateertha who is equally important in his contributions to the Telugu tradition of Dattatreya. He was a proponent of Advaita philosophy and dedicated his two epics, Anubhavadarpanamu and Shivadnyanamanjari to Shri Dattatreya. His famous Vivekachintamani book was translated into Kannada by Nijashivagunayogi and Lingayat saint Shanatalingaswami translated this into Marathi.

See also 
 Advaita Vedanta
 Bhedabheda
 Dattatreya Yoga Shastra
 Dvaita Vedanta
 Upanishads
 Triglav

References

Bibliography 

 Abhayananda, S., Dattatreya's Song of the Avadhut. ATMA Books (Olympia, Wash), 2000. .
Hariprasad Shivprasad Joshi (1965). Origin and Development of Dattātreya Worship in India . The Maharaja Sayajirao University of Baroda.

 Harper, Katherine Anne; Brown, Robert L. (2002). The Roots of Tantra. New York: State University of New York Press. .
 
 Rigopoulos, Antonio (1998). Dattatreya: The Immortal Guru, Yogin, and Avatara. New York: State University of New York Press. .
 Subramanian K. N., Wisdom of Sri Dattatreya. Sura Books, 2006. .
 Guru Gita, BAPU (Prabhakar Motiwale, Indore), chaitanya ashram, Datta Shakti Pith

External links 

 Dattatreya, Shiva-Shakti, Mahendranath Paramahams
 The Avadhuta Gita on Wikisource
 Sree Datta Vaibhavam | A path for spiritualistic and materialistic life improvement
 Dattatreya Birth Temple ,

Avatars of Vishnu
Hindu gods
Hindu tantric deities
Inchegeri Sampradaya
Forms of Shiva